Weightlifting was contested at the 2011 Summer Universiade from August 13 to August 18 at the Comprehensive Training Hall and the Weightlifting Training Hall in Shenzhen Sport School in Shenzhen, China. Men's and women's individual and team events were held.

Medal summary

Medal table

Men's events

Women's events

References

2011 Summer Universiade events
2011 in weightlifting
2011 Summer Universiade